Morten Avnskjold (born 26 August 1979) is a former Danish professional football midfielder. He played with the Herfølge squad that won the 1999–2000 Danish Superliga.

References

External links
  National team profile

1979 births
Danish men's footballers
Denmark youth international footballers
Danish expatriate men's footballers
Danish Superliga players
Allsvenskan players
Herfølge Boldklub players
Køge Boldklub players
Landskrona BoIS players
Living people
SønderjyskE Fodbold players
Expatriate footballers in Sweden
Association football midfielders
Køge Nord FC players
Køge Nord FC managers
Danish football managers